This is the discography of the German musical project Enigma.

Note: all albums were released on Virgin Records or its subsidiary Virgin Schallplatten GmbH. The Eurochart singles top and Eurochart albums top are compiled by the trade magazine Music & Media (a subsidiary of Billboard magazine) and are based on the sales charts of 16 European countries. (countries list). US Top data: for singles from the Billboard Hot 100, for albums from the Billboard 200;

The Enigma project has sold over 70 million records worldwide.

Albums

Studio albums

Compilation albums

Remix albums
 Love Sensuality Devotion: The Remix Collection (2001)

Box sets
 Trilogy (1998), UK: Silver
 15 Years After (2005)
 The Platinum Collection (2009)
 Enigma: Classic Album Selection (A box set featuring the first five albums) (2013)

Extended plays
 Eppur si muove (2006)

Singles

DVDs

 Remember the Future (2001)
 MCMXC a.D.: The Complete Video Album (2003)
 MCMXC a.D.: The Complete Video Album / Remember the Future box set (2004)
 A posteriori (2006)
 Seven Lives Many Faces (2008)

Other miscellaneous releases
 In the Beginning... (1997) – (Promotional Compilation CD)
 The Dusted Variations (2005)  – bonus disc of Enigma covers in 15 Years After
 A posteriori (Private Lounge Remixes) (2007)  – several remixes based on tracks from A posteriori, exclusive to iTunes

References

 Chart positions of albums and singles (Mirror site)
 UK chart positions
 [ Billboard album charts from Allmusic]
 [ Billboard single charts from Allmusic]
 EnigmaMusic.com discography

Discography
Discographies of German artists
Discographies of Spanish artists
Discographies of Italian artists
Discographies of Romanian artists
Pop music group discographies